Weissella is a genus of gram-positive bacteria placed within the family Lactobacillaceae, formerly considered species of the Leuconostoc paramesenteroides group. The morphology of Weissella species varies from spherical or lenticular cells to irregular rods. Several strains of  Weissella cibaria and Weissella confusa have shown probiotic potential. In particular, the cell-free culture supernatant of Weissella confusa shows a number of beneficial characteristics, such as antibacterial potential and anti-inflammatory efficiency. However, several strains of W. confusa are opportunistic bacteria. A number of studies have been done on the safety of the bacterial species, indicating their probiotic potential. The Senate Commission on Food Safety has validated the use of W. confusa in food.

Species
The genus Weissella comprises the following species:
 Weissella beninensis Padonou et al. 2010
 Weissella bombi Praet et al. 2015
 Weissella ceti Vela et al. 2011
 Weissella cibaria Björkroth et al. 2002
 Weissella coleopterorum Hyun et al. 2021
 Weissella confusa corrig. (Holzapfel and Kandler 1969) Collins et al. 1994
 Weissella cryptocerci Heo et al. 2019
 Weissella diestrammenae Oh et al. 2013
 Weissella fabalis Snauwaert et al. 2013
 Weissella fabaria De Bruyne et al. 2010
 Weissella ghanensis De Bruyne et al. 2008
 Weissella halotolerans (Kandler et al. 1983) Collins et al. 1994
 Weissella hellenica Collins et al. 1994

 Weissella kandleri (Holzapfel and van Wyk 1983) Collins et al. 1994

 Weissella koreensis Lee et al. 2002
 Weissella minor (Kandler et al. 1983) Collins et al. 1994
 Weissella muntiaci Lin et al. 2020
 Weissella oryzae Tohno et al. 2013
 Weissella paramesenteroides (Garvie 1967) Collins et al. 1994
 Weissella sagaensis Li et al. 2020
 Weissella soli Magnusson et al. 2002
 Weissella thailandensis Tanasupawat et al. 2000
 Weissella uvarum Nisiotou et al. 2014
 Weissella viridescens (Niven and Evans 1957) Collins et al. 1994

Phylogeny
The currently accepted taxonomy is based on the List of Prokaryotic names with Standing in Nomenclature and the phylogeny is based on whole-genome sequences.

References

External links
Weissella confusa Infection in Primate (Cercopithecus mona)

 
Bacteria genera